Eve Mirjam Laron OAM (1931 – 6 July 2009) was a Hungarian-born Australia architectural writer based in  Sydney.

Laron was born in Hungary in 1931. In 1949, she left Hungary on foot with her future husband, George Gavriel Laron, walking through neighbouring Czechoslovakia to refugee camps in Vienna. She lived in Israel from 1949 to 1955 before emigrating to  Sydney in 1955. In 1983, she founded an organisation called Constructive Women Inc., an association for female architects, landscape architects, and planners, as well as other women involved in the building industry. In 2001, she was awarded the Medal of the Order of Australia in recognition of her contribution to architectural discipline.

She died in 2009. Laron Lane is named after her in Australian Capital Territory.

References

 http://www.architectureweek.com/2001/0620/design_2-2.html
 http://www.womenaustralia.info/leaders/biogs/WLE0030b.htm

1931 births
2009 deaths
Date of birth missing
Recipients of the Medal of the Order of Australia
20th-century Australian architects
Australian women architects
Organization founders
Hungarian emigrants to Australia
Hungarian Jews
Australian Jews
20th-century Australian women
21st-century Australian women
21st-century Australian people